Kevin Hampf (born 24 March 1984 in Rodewisch, East Germany) is a German footballer who plays for VfB Auerbach.

Career 
He made his debut on the professional league level in the 2. Bundesliga for FC Erzgebirge Aue on 22 May 2004 when he came in as a substitute in the 72nd minute in a game against Rot-Weiß Oberhausen.

References

1984 births
Living people
People from Rodewisch
People from Bezirk Karl-Marx-Stadt
German footballers
Footballers from Saxony
FC Erzgebirge Aue players
FC Rot-Weiß Erfurt players
Chemnitzer FC players
2. Bundesliga players
Association football wingers